Odontobutis haifengensis is a species of freshwater sleeper endemic to China where it is only found in fresh and brackish waters of Guangdong Province.  This species can reach  in standard length.

References

Freshwater fish of China
Odontobutis
Fish described in 1985